Joseph's Dream is a 1620s painting by Daniele Crespi, now in the Kunsthistorisches Museum in Vienna. It shows an angel appearing to Joseph of Nazareth in his sleep to warn him of Herod the Great's intent to kill Jesus and to instruct him to flee into Egypt (Matthew 2:13). The subject depicts the second of Saint Joseph's four dreams as noted in the Gospel of Matthew.

See also
 Joseph's Dream (Rembrandt, 1645)

References 

1620s paintings
Baroque paintings
Paintings in the collection of the Kunsthistorisches Museum
Paintings of Saint Joseph
Nativity of Jesus in art
Angels in art